Glazovsky District (Glaz joros) is an administrative and municipal district (raion), one of the twenty-five in the Udmurt Republic, Russia. It is located in the north of the republic. Its administrative center is the city of Glazov (which is not administratively a part of the district). Population:  18,792 (2002 Census);

Geography
The Cheptsa River flows through the central parts of the district. Other significant rivers include the Pyzel, the Ubyt, the Sepych, and the Varyzh.

Administrative and municipal status
Within the framework of administrative divisions, Glazovsky District is one of the twenty-five in the republic. The city of Glazov serves as its administrative center, despite being incorporated separately as a city of republic significance—an administrative unit with the status equal to that of the districts.

As a municipal division, the district is incorporated as Glazovsky Municipal District. The city of republic significance of Glazov is incorporated separately from the district as Glazov Urban Okrug.

Demographics
Ethnic composition (according to the 2002 Census): Udmurt people: 79%; Russians: 17.4%; Tatars: 2%; others: 1.6%.

References

Notes

Sources

Districts of Udmurtia